Inuit Ataqatigiit is a democratic socialist, separatist political party in Greenland that aims to make Greenland an independent state. The party, founded as a political organisation in 1976, was born out of the increased youth radicalism in Denmark during the 1970s. Traditionally in favour of a socialist economy, the party has been criticised from the left of having gradually moved towards a capitalist approach, supporting a market economy and privatisation. Inuit Ataqatigiit believes that an independent Greenland should be competitive while fighting to keep the environment clean.

In 1982, the party successfully campaigned in a national referendum for Greenland to leave the European Economic Community (EEC). Inuit Ataqatigiit is represented in the Folketing (the Danish parliament) by Aaja Chemnitz Larsen. Múte B. Egede has been the party's leader since December 2018.

Inuit Ataqatigiit made a major electoral breakthrough in the 2009 Greenlandic parliamentary election. Making gains from the 2005 Greenlandic parliamentary election, it doubled its total number of seats in the Parliament from 7 to 14 seats out of 31, just two seats short of a majority, and nearly doubled its total vote share from 22.4% to 43.7%. It supplanted both its coalition partners, shifting the Forward party from first to second and the Democrats party from second to third. At the 2014 elections the party obtained 11 members in the Greenlandic parliament, but after elections in 2018, their share decreased to eight seats. Following the 2021 elections, Inuit Ataqatigiit once again became the largest party in the Greenlandic parliament, with 12 seats.

Election results

Parliament of Greenland (Inatsisartut)

Parliament of the Kingdom of Denmark (Folketinget)

References

External links
Official website
The North Atlantic Group in the Danish Parliament

Political parties in Greenland
Pro-independence parties
Democratic socialist parties in Europe
Democratic socialist parties in North America
Indigenist political parties in North America
Left-wing nationalist parties
Nationalist parties in North America
Separatism in Denmark
Political parties established in 1976
Socialist parties in Greenland
Greenlandic nationalism